MSU Faculty of Computational Mathematics and Cybernetics (CMC), founded in 1970 by Andrey Tikhonov, is a part of Moscow State University.

Education
CMC is a Russian research and training center in the fields of applied mathematics, computing and software development . Education at CMC combines theoretical studies,  practical exercises, and research.

Main 12 Master's programs:
 Mathematical physics
 Mathematical modeling
 Computational diagnostics
 Numerical methods
 Theory of probability and mathematical statistics 
 Operations research and systems analysis 
 Optimization and optimal control
 Mathematical cybernetics
 Software for computers and computer systems
 Networks software
 System programming
 Decision making in Economics and Finance

History

A group of professors and scholars from Department of Physics and Department of Mechanics and Mathematics led by Andrey Tikhonov founded CMC in 1970. The three departments are still closely connected.

The faculty houses the 33,072-processor Lomonosov supercomputer in Moscow. The system was designed by T-Platforms, and used Xeon 2.93 GHz processors, Nvidia 2070 GPUs, and an Infiniband interconnect.
Following companies work with CS MSU: Intel, Microsoft, Sun Microsystems, Borland, Software AG, Siemens, IBM/Lotus, Samsung, HP.

Following the school's support for the 2022 Russian invasion of Ukraine, Intel and AMD, the largest chip manufacturers in the world, whose processors are used in the Moscow State University supercomputer, as well as NVIDIA, reacted by suspending deliveries of their processors to Russia.

Deans
The deans of the faculty:
 Andrey Tikhonov (1970–1990)
 Dmitrij Kostomarov (1991–1999)
 Evgeny Moiseev (1999-2019)
 Igor Sokolov (since March 2019)

Structure

Departments 
The faculty consists of 19 Academic departments:

Scientific laboratories 
The faculty includes 18 research laboratories:
 Laboratory of Mathematical Physics
 Laboratory of Computational Electrodynamics
 Laboratory of Heat and Mass Transfer Processes Simulation
 Laboratory of Inverse Problems
 Laboratory of Mathematical Methods of Image Processing
 Laboratory of Mathematical Modeling in Physics
 Laboratory of Difference Methods
 Open Laboratory of Information Technologies
 Laboratory of Statistical Analysis
 Laboratory of Mathematical Problems of Computer Security
 Laboratory of Computational Practice and Information Systems
 The Computer Systems Laboratory
 Laboratory of Information Systems Security
 Computer Graphics and Multimedia Laboratory
 Laboratory of Programming Technologies
 Laboratory of Ternary Informatics
 Research Laboratory of Computational Modeling Tools
 Laboratory of Industrial Mathematics

Рrofessors
Faculty staff consists of more than 550 professors and research scientists. The list of scientists that worked in the Faculty of Computational Mathematics and Cybernetics includes:
 Lev Pontryagin, the founder and the first chair of the department of Optimal Control.
 Sergey Yablonsky, the founder and the first chair of the department of Mathematical Cybernetics.
 Oleg Lupanov, who was affiliated with the department of Mathematical Cybernetics and taught the undergraduate course on discrete mathematics.
 Yuriy Prokhorov, the chair of the department of Probability Theory and Mathematical Statistics.
 Guriy Marchuk, the chair of the department of Computational Technologies and Modeling.

Scientists have worked and are working at the faculty in different years:
 Andrey Tikhonov (1970–1993)
 Lev Pontryagin (1970–1988)
 Sergey Yablonsky (1970–1998)
 Oleg Lupanov (1970–1980)
 Lev Korolyov (1970–2016)
 Yuriy Prokhorov (1970–2013)
 Guriy Marchuk (2004–2013)
 Nikolai Bakhvalov (1970–1981)
 Evgenij D'yakonov (1970–2006)
 Viktor Sadovnichiy (1981–1982)
 Yury Osipov (1989-now)
 Yuri Zhuravlyov (1997-now)
 Viktor Ivannikov (1994-2016)

Graduates

References

Literature

External links 

 Moscow State University
 

Computational Mathematics and Cybernetics, Faculty of
Education in Moscow
Computer science institutes